Naoshi (written: 直 or 直志) is a masculine Japanese given name. Notable people with the name include:

, Japanese manga artist
, Japanese physicist
, Japanese manga artist
, Japanese poet
, Japanese video game composer and musician
, Japanese footballer
, Japanese politician

Japanese masculine given names